John G. Mapes (May 6, 1906 – March 23, 1989) was an American public relations executive. He served as vice chairman of Hill & Knowlton from 1965 to 1967. Founder John W. Hill considered Mapes a protege and "more than anything else . . . a relative."

Life and career

Mapes was born in Ohio. He joined Hill & Knowlton in 1934. He became executive vice president in 1947. After he divorced his first wife, Dorothy Gwyneth Glynn, Mapes and his second wife Jane Stewart founded Group Attitudes Corp. in 1950. Hill & Knowlton acquired Group Attitudes in 1956. Mapes died of pneumonia in a Phoenix, Arizona nursing home.

Mapes was the writer of the 1953 book Men and Unions.

References

1906 births
1989 deaths
American public relations people
20th-century American businesspeople